Wael Jassar (born 22 November 1976) is a Lebanese singer.

Discography
Kelmet Wada’a Beta’zebne
Saat Baqoul
Meshit kalass
Eldonia Allimitny
Metgarrinbin
Zay Elaasal
Fi Hadrat al Mahboub
2009 Tewaedini 
2011 Kul Daqeeqa Shakhsieh

References

External links 
 

1976 births
Living people
21st-century Lebanese male singers
Lebanese Muslims